The Western Maine Lakes and Mountains region spans most of Maine's western border with New Hampshire.  A small part of the scenic White Mountain National Forest is located in this area. The region consists of Oxford County, Androscoggin County, Franklin County, as well as northern York and interior Cumberland counties. The largest cities in the region are Lewiston and Auburn. Notable towns include Bethel, Bridgton, Oxford, Rangeley, and Rumford. Many of the state's highest peaks are located in the region, although the highest, Mount Katahdin, is not.

The area is known for its crystal clear lakes and scenic hiking trails in the summer. Fall can also bring tourists who come to see the brilliant Autumn leaf color provided by the region's maple dominated forestry.  In the winter, skiing becomes the region's largest attraction. This region has many resorts and ski areas to choose from, including Pleasant Mountain in Bridgton, Sunday River in Bethel, Black Mountain in Rumford, Saddleback Mountain in Rangley and Sugarloaf in Carrabassett Valley. The economy in these areas is largely based on seasonal activities and tourism.

The Appalachian National Scenic Trail passes through this region, and the portion that passes through the region's Mahoosuc Notch is popularly considered by hikers to be the most difficult mile of the entire trail.

See also

Auburn, Maine
Bridgton, Maine
Crocker Mountain (Maine)
Fryeburg Fair
Lewiston, Maine
Long Lake (Maine)
Mount Abraham (Maine)
Mount Bigelow (Maine)
Mount Redington
Mountain Division
Moxie Mountain 
Old Speck Mountain
Oxford Casino
Sugar Maple
Saddleback Horn
Saddleback Mountain (Rangeley, Maine)
Sandy River and Rangeley Lakes Railroad
Sebago Lake
South Crocker Mountain
Spaulding Mountain
Stephen King
Sugarloaf Mountain (Franklin County, Maine)

References

Mountain ranges of Maine
Regions of Maine
Mountains of Oxford County, Maine
Mountains of York County, Maine
Mountains of Cumberland County, Maine